Peucedanum is a genus of flowering plant in the carrot family, Apiaceae.

Species
It contains the following species:

 Peucedanum abbreviatum E. Mey.
 Peucedanum acaule R.H.Shan & M.L.Sheh 
 Peucedanum achaicum Halácsy
 Peucedanum adae Woronow
 Peucedanum aegopodioides (Boiss.) Vandas
 Peucedanum akaliniae Akpulat, Gürdal & Tuncay
 Peucedanum alpinum (Sieber ex Schult.) B.L.Burtt & P.H.Davis
 Peucedanum alsaticum L.
 Peucedanum ampliatum K.T. Fu
 Peucedanum anamallayense C.B.Clarke
 Peucedanum angelicoides H. Wolff ex Kretschmer
 Peucedanum angolense (Welw. ex Ficalho) Cannon
 Peucedanum angustisectum (Engl.) Norman
 Peucedanum aragonense Rouy & E.G.Camus
 Peucedanum arenarium Waldst. & Kit.
 Peucedanum arenarium ssp. neumayeri (Vis.) Stoj. & Stef.
 Peucedanum austriacum (Jacq.) W.D.J. Koch
 Peucedanum autumnale (J.Thiébaut) Bernardi
 Peucedanum baicalense (Redowski ex Willd.) Koch
 Peucedanum belutschistanicum H.Wolff
 Peucedanum brachystylum (Hiern) Drude
 Peucedanum caespitosum H. Wolff
 Peucedanum calcareum Albov
 Peucedanum camerunense Jacq.-Fél.
 Peucedanum carvifolia Vill.
 Peucedanum carvifolium Vill.
 Peucedanum cervaria (L.) Cusson ex Lapeyr.
 Peucedanum cervariifolium C.A. Mey.
 Peucedanum ceylanicum Gardner
 Peucedanum chabraei Rchb. ex Moesl.
 Peucedanum chenur Mozaff.
 Peucedanum chinense M. Hiroe
 Peucedanum chujaense K.Kim, S.H.Oh, Chan S.Kim & C.W.Park
 Peucedanum coriaceum Rchb.
 Peucedanum cynorhiza Sond.
 Peucedanum decumbens Maxim.
 Peucedanum dehradunense Babu
 Peucedanum delavayi Franch.
 Peucedanum dhana Wall.
 Peucedanum dielsianum Fedde ex H. Wolff
 Peucedanum dissectum DC.
 Peucedanum dissolutum (Diels) H. Wolff
 Peucedanum elegans Kom.
 Peucedanum eurycarpum (A. Gray) J.M. Coult. & Rose
 Peucedanum falcaria Turcz.
 Peucedanum fleischmannii Benth. & Hook.f.
 Peucedanum florentii (Franch. & Sav. ex Maxim.)
 Peucedanum formosanum Hayata —()
 Peucedanum franchetii C.Y. Wu & F.T. Pu
 Peucedanum gabrielae R.Frey
 Peucedanum galbaniopse H. Wolff
 Peucedanum gallicum Latourr.
 Peucedanum graveolens (L.) B.D.Jacks.
 Peucedanum guangxiense R.H.Shan & M.L. Sheh
 Peucedanum guvenianum Yild. & H.Duman
 Peucedanum harry-smithii Fedde ex H.Wolff
 Peucedanum henryi H.Wolff
 Peucedanum hispanicum Endl. ex Walp.
 Peucedanum huangshanense Lu Q.Huang, H.S.Peng & S.S.Chu
 Peucedanum hypoleucum Benth. & Hook.f.
 Peucedanum hyrcanicum H.Gholiz., Naqinezhad & Mozaff.
 Peucedanum illyricum F.Malý
 Peucedanum isetense Spreng. ex Schult.
 Peucedanum japonicum Thunb.
 Peucedanum kupense
 Peucedanum ledebourielloides K.T.Fu
 Peucedanum longifolium Waldst. & Kit.
 Peucedanum longshengense R.H.Shan & M.L.Sheh
 Peucedanum mashanense R.H.Shan & M.L.Sheh
 Peucedanum medicum Dunn
 Peucedanum miroense K.Kim, H.J.Suh & J.H.Song
 Peucedanum montanum Benth. & Hook.f.
 Peucedanum morisonii Besser
 Peucedanum muliense M.L.Sheh
 Peucedanum multivittatum Maxim.
 Peucedanum nagpurense (C.B.Clarke) Prain
 Peucedanum nepalense Mukerjee
 Peucedanum nanum R.H.Shan & M.L.Sheh
 Peucedanum oculeolatum Engl.
 Peucedanum officinale L. —Sulphurweed or hog's fennel
 Peucedanum orientale G.Don
 Peucedanum oroselinum
 Peucedanum ostruthium (L.) W.D.J. Koch —Masterwort
 Peucedanum ozhatayiorum Akpulat & Akalin
 Peucedanum palustre (L.) Moench —Marsh hog's fennel or milk parsley
 Peucedanum parkinsonii Fedde ex H.Wolff
 Peucedanum payapicum (M.Hiroe) M.Hiroe
 Peucedanum pimenovii Mozaff.
 Peucedanum platycarpa E.Mey.
 Peucedanum polymorphum Lag. ex Sweet
 Peucedanum pradeepianum K.M.P.Kumar, Hareesh & Balach.
 Peucedanum praeruptorum Dunn —Qian hu in Chinese
 Peucedanum puberulum Turcz.
 Peucedanum pubescens Hand.-Mazz.
 Peucedanum quangxiense R.H.Shan & M.L.Sheh
 Peucedanum rablense (Wulfen) W.D.J.Koch
 Peucedanum rochelianum Heuff.
 Peucedanum ruthenicum M.Bieb.
 Peucedanum sandwicense Hillebr. —Makou
 Peucedanum schottii Bess.
 Peucedanum shanianum F.L.Chen & Y.F.Deng
 Peucedanum siamicum Craib
 Peucedanum silaus M.Bieb.
 Peucedanum songpanense R.H.Shan & F.T.Pu
 Peucedanum spec (L.) Lapeyr.
 Peucedanum suberianum Sond.
 Peucedanum sylvestre Hegetschw.
 Peucedanum tongkangense K.Kim, H.J.Suh & J.H.Song
 Peucedanum trachystylum K.Schum.
 Peucedanum translucens Rech.fil.
 Peucedanum vaginatum Ledeb.
 Peucedanum verticillare Spreng.
 Peucedanum violaceum R.H.Shan & M.L.Sheh
 Peucedanum vourinense (Leute) Hartvig
 Peucedanum wolffianum Fedde ex H.Wolff
 Peucedanum wulongense R.H.Shan & M.L.Sheh
 Peucedanum yunnanense H.Wolff
 Peucedanum zedelmeierianum Manden.

Former species

Species formerly classified as Peucedanum include:

References

External links

 
Apioideae genera
Taxa named by Carl Linnaeus
Taxonomy articles created by Polbot